Notable people with the surname Braconnier include:

  (born 1942), French psychoanalyst 
 Charles-Marie de Braconnier (1849–1917), Belgian soldier who participated in the expeditions led by Henry Morton Stanley
  (1912–1999), a senator of Aisne, France, in 1971–1998
 Jean Braconnier ("Braconnier dit Lourdault", died 1512), a French singer and composer of the Renaissance
  (1922–1985), a French mathematician
 Raymond de Braconnier (born 1918), Belgian alpine skier 
 Séraphin Braconnier (1812–1884), French naturalist